Zombie was an Israeli youth-oriented video gaming magazine that was published from 1994 to 1997. Around 35 issues were released.

References 

Video game magazines
Defunct magazines published in Israel
Hebrew-language mass media
Magazines established in 1994
Magazines disestablished in 1997
Jewish magazines